HD 176664, also known as HR 7190 or rarely 43 G. Telescopii, is a solitary star located in the southern constellation Telescopium. It is faintly visible to the naked eye as an orange-hued star with an apparent magnitude of 5.93. At its current distance HD 176664's brightness is diminished by two-tenths of a magnitude due to interstellar dust. It has an absolute magnitude of +0.94.

HD 176664 has a stellar classification of K0/1 III, indicating that it is an evolved K-type star with a spectrum intermediate of a K0 and K1 giant star. It has a comparable mass to the Sun but it has expanded to 12.4 times its girth. HD 176664 is metal enriched ([Fe/H] = +0.25) and spins too slowly to be measured accurately. A 1993 paper by Olin J. Eggen lists HD 176664 as a member of the Milky Way's old disk population.

The star has two optical companions designated CD −51°11893B and CD −51°11893C. B is a distant 13th magnitude star located 19.4" away along a position angle of 9° while C is a 12th magnitude star located 27.5" away along a position angle of 29°.

References

K-type giants
Multiple stars
High-proper-motion stars
Telescopium (constellation)
CD-51 11893
176664
093624
7190
Telescopii, 43